England Peak is a sharp peak in Antarctica, about  high, located  south of Aughenbaugh Peak and east of Neuburg Peak in the western part of the Dufek Massif, Pensacola Mountains, Antarctica. It was named by the Advisory Committee on Antarctic Names, at the suggestion of United States Geological Survey (USGS) field party leader Arthur B. Ford, after Anthony W. England, a USGS geophysicist who worked in the Dufek Massif during the 1976–77 and 1978–79 seasons.

References 

Mountains of Queen Elizabeth Land
Pensacola Mountains